Five ships of the Royal Navy have been named HMS Achates after Achates, a character in Roman mythology. A sixth was planned but never completed:

 was a 13-gun ship launched in 1573, hulked in 1590 and sold in 1605.
 was a 10-gun  launched in 1808 and wrecked in 1810 off Guadeloupe.
 was a 16-gun brig-sloop, originally the French Milan, launched in 1807, that HMS Surveillante captured on 30 October 1809, and that was sold in 1818.
 was an  launched in 1912 and sold in 1921.
 was an A-class destroyer launched in 1929 and sunk in 1942 by the German cruiser .
She was launched in 1945, but was never completed, and was sunk as a target in 1950.
A fictional HMS Achates, a 64-gun ship of the line, appears in Success to the Brave, the 15th novel in the Richard Bolitho series written by Douglas Reeman (writing as Alexander Kent).

References

Royal Navy ship names